Morphosphaera chrysomeloides is a species of skeletonizing leaf beetle in the family Chrysomelidae. It is found in Taiwan and eastern Asia.

References

External links

 

Galerucinae
Beetles of Asia
Beetles described in 1866
Taxa named by Henry Walter Bates